Euphrosyne of Kiev (also Euphrosine of Novgorod; ;  1130 – c. 1193) was Queen consort of Hungary by marriage to King Géza II of Hungary.

Life
Euphrosyne was the first daughter of Grand Prince Mstislav I of Kiev and his second wife, Liubava Dmitrievna Zavidich.

Hungary
In 1146, Euphrosyne married King Géza II of Hungary, who had come of age shortly before.

During her husband's reign Euphrosyne did not intervene in the politics of the kingdom, but after his death on 31 May 1162, her influence strengthened over their son, King Stephen III. The young king had to struggle against his uncles Ladislaus and Stephen to save his throne, and Euphrosyne took an active part in the struggles. She persuaded King Vladislaus II of Bohemia to give military assistance to her son against the invasion of the Emperor Manuel I Komnenos.

Euphrosyne's favourite son was the youngest, Duke Géza of Hungary. When King Stephen III died on 4 March 1172, she was planning to ensure his succession against her older son, Béla, who had been living in the court of the Emperor Manuel I Komnenos. However, Béla came back, and he was crowned on 13 January 1173, although the Archbishop Lucas of Esztergom denied his coronation. Shortly after, King Béla III arrested his brother, which increased the tension between Euphrosyne and her son. Duke Géza soon managed to escape, probably with Euphrosyne's help, but in 1177 he was again arrested.

Later life
In 1186, Euphrosyne tried to release her younger son again, but she failed. King Béla III ordered the arrest of Euphrosyne and kept her confined in the fortress of Barancs (Serbian: Braničevo). Shortly after, Euphrosyne was set free, but she was obliged to leave the kingdom for Constantinople. From Constantinople she moved to Jerusalem where she lived as a nun in the convent of the Hospitallers, and then in the Basilian monastery of Saint Sabbas.

Issue
She had the following children:

 King Stephen III of Hungary (1147 – 4 March 1172); married, firstly, Yaroslavna of Halych, no issue; married, secondly, Agnes of Austria (1154–1182), had issue.
 King Béla III of Hungary (1148 – 23 April 1196); married, firstly, Agnes of Antioch, had issue; married, secondly, Margaret of France, widow of Henry the Young King, no issue.
 Elisabeth (c. 1149 – after 1189); married Frederick of Bohemia and had issue.
 Géza (c. 1151 – before 1210).
 Árpád, died in infancy.
 Odola (c. 1156 – 1199); married Sviatopluk of Bohemia.
 Helena (c. 1158 – 25 May 1199); married Leopold V, Duke of Austria and had issue.
 Margaret (posthumously, 1162 – bef. 1208), married, firstly, Isaac Dukas "Makrodukas" and, secondly, Andrew, Ispán of Somogy.

References

Sources
 Soltész, István: Árpád-házi királynék (Gabo, 1999)
 Kristó, Gyula – Makk, Ferenc: Az Árpád-ház uralkodói (IPC Könyvek, 1996)
 Encyclopædia Britannica (Subscription required)
 Geza II of Hungary (in Hungarian)

Kievan Rus' princesses
1130s births
1190s deaths
Hungarian queens consort
12th-century Hungarian nuns
Monomakhovichi family
Hungarian people of Russian descent
Year of birth uncertain
Year of death uncertain
12th-century Rus' people
Queen mothers